Stephen Bradley Womack (born November 10, 1972) is an American entrepreneur, bar owner, and television personality best known for appearing twice as The Bachelor on the reality show The Bachelor.

References

1972 births
Businesspeople from Texas
Living people
Businesspeople from Atlanta
People from Austin, Texas
People from Polk County, Texas
American restaurateurs
American bartenders
Identical twins
American twins
Bachelor Nation contestants